Alwoodley is a civil parish and a ward in the metropolitan borough of the City of Leeds, West Yorkshire, England.  The parish and ward contain 16 listed buildings that are recorded in the National Heritage List for England. All the listed buildings are designated at Grade II, the lowest of the three grades, which is applied to "buildings of national importance and special interest".   The area is to the north of the centre of Leeds, and contains the districts of Alwoodley and Moor Allerton.  Most of the southern part is residential, and the northern part is rural.  The majority of the listed buildings are houses, cottages and associated structures, farmhouses and farm buildings, and some farm buildings have been converted for residential use.  There is also a mill converted into a dwelling.  The other listed buildings include a road bridge, an aqueduct, a well or reservoir, a church and its lych gate, and a war memorial.


Buildings

References

Citations

Sources

 

Lists of listed buildings in West Yorkshire